USS Rogers Blood (DE-555) was a proposed World War II United States Navy John C. Butler-class destroyer escort that was never completed.

Plans called for Rogers Blood to be built at the Boston Navy Yard at Boston, Massachusetts. The contract for her construction was cancelled in 1944.

The name Rogers Blood was reassigned to the destroyer escort USS Rogers Blood (DE-605), which was converted during construction into the fast transport USS Rogers Blood (APD-115) and was in commission as such from 1945 to 1946.

References
Navsource Naval History: Photographic History of the U.S. Navy: Destroyer Escorts, Frigates, Littoral Warfare Vessels

John C. Butler-class destroyer escorts
Cancelled ships of the United States Navy